Horace is a city in Greeley County, Kansas, United States.  As of the 2020 census, the population of the city was 102.

History
Horace was founded in 1886. The city is named after Horace Greeley of Chappaqua, New York, editor of the New York Tribune. Greeley encouraged western settlement with the motto  "Go West, young man".

A post office was opened in Horace in 1886, and remained in operation until it was discontinued in 1965.

On November 6, 2007, voters in rural Greeley County and in Tribune approved a consolidation of the county and the city.  Horace, however, decided against consolidation.

Geography
Horace is located at  (38.476692, -101.790853).

Demographics

2010 census
As of the census of 2010, there were 70 people, 33 households, and 22 families residing in the city. The racial makeup of the city was 94.3% White, 2.9% African American, and 2.9% from two or more races. Hispanic or Latino of any race were 5.7% of the population.

There were 33 households, of which 30.3% had children under the age of 18 living with them, 54.5% were married couples living together, 9.1% had a female householder with no husband present, 3.0% had a male householder with no wife present, and 33.3% were non-families. 33.3% of all households were made up of individuals, and 3% had someone living alone who was 65 years of age or older. The average household size was 2.12 and the average family size was 2.68.

The median age in the city was 46.6 years. 22.9% of residents were under the age of 18; 4.2% were between the ages of 18 and 24; 15.7% were from 25 to 44; 41.5% were from 45 to 64; and 15.7% were 65 years of age or older. The gender makeup of the city was 47.1% male and 52.9% female.

2000 census
As of the census of 2000, there were 143 people, 55 households, and 37 families residing in the city. The racial makeup of the city was 94.41% White, 0.70% African American, 2.80% from other races, and 2.10% from two or more races. Hispanic or Latino of any race were 15.38% of the population.

There were 55 households, out of which 38.2% had children under the age of 18 living with them, 56.4% were married couples living together, 5.5% had a female householder with no husband present, and 32.7% were non-families. 29.1% of all households were made up of individuals, and 5.5% had someone living alone who was 65 years of age or older. The average household size was 2.60 and the average family size was 3.22.

In the city, the population was spread out, with 31.5% under the age of 18, 6.3% from 18 to 24, 36.4% from 25 to 44, 20.3% from 45 to 64, and 5.6% who were 65 years of age or older. The median age was 34 years. For every 100 females, there were 123.4 males. For every 100 females age 18 and over, there were 122.7 males.

The median income for a household in the city was $26,875, and the median income for a family was $43,125. Males had a median income of $30,625 versus $21,250 for females. The per capita income for the city was $15,602. There were 15.6% of families and 20.4% of the population living below the poverty line, including 25.5% of under eighteens and none of those over 64.

Economy
Horace has two grain elevator complexes and a spray fertilizer company.

References

Further reading

External links
 Horace - Directory of Public Officials
 USD 200, local school district
 Horace City Map, KDOT

Cities in Kansas
Cities in Greeley County, Kansas
Horace Greeley
1886 establishments in Kansas
Populated places established in 1886